Queen Isabella Memorial Bridge was developed as a concrete pier-and-beam bridge with a steel cantilever main beam span. The watercourse thoroughfare is located in southern Cameron County, Texas and is the only road connecting South Padre Island to the geography of Texas.

The Causeway opened in 1974 and replaced the previous bridge, which had also been named Queen Isabella Causeway. A central section of the original causeway was removed and renamed the Queen Isabella State Fishing Pier. It is named after Queen Isabella of Castile.

Incidents

1996 plane crash
On August 13, 1996, at 6:22 p.m., a Cessna TR182 collided with the causeway, killing both the pilot-in-command and the pilot-rated passenger, while maneuvering near Port Isabel, Texas. Witnesses and local authorities reported that the airplane was observed flying a pass from north to south under the causeway. The airplane made a 180-degree turn and approached the bridge toward the north for another pass; however, the airplane struck a concrete bridge pylon and column and descended uncontrolled into the water. Witnesses recalled an explosion and black smoke as the airplane struck the bridge. Portions of the airplane's vertical and horizontal stabilizers were found projecting from the bridge column at about eight feet above the waterline. Texas Department of Public Safety divers located the fuselage submerged on the west side of the column in approximately 8 to 10 feet of water. The post-mortem toxicology report indicated that the pilot-in-command tested positive for cocaine and a concentration of 143 mg/dl ethanol in the blood.

2001 causeway collapse

In the early morning of September 15, 2001, four loaded barges crashed into one of the Queen Isabella Causeway's support columns traveling at 0.2 miles per hour. Three 80-foot (24.4 m) sections of the bridge fell into the water, leaving a large gap in the roadway. The collapsed sections were just next to the highest point of the causeway, making it difficult for approaching drivers to notice. Eight people were killed as their cars fell 85 feet (26 m) into the water. Five vehicles were recovered from the water along with three survivors.

The collapse had a significant economic impact on the region since the causeway is the only road connecting the island to the mainland. The bridge also carried electricity lines and fresh water to the island. State officials brought in ferries to temporarily carry cars across the Laguna Madre.

In addition to the three bridge sections that toppled in the original accident, two adjacent sections were also replaced due to structural damage. The causeway was reopened on November 21, 2001. Several safety features were added to the structure. The support columns were reinforced, and a $12 million fiber optic driver warning system was installed. News and discussion of the collapse was mostly confined to local and regional sources due to the September 11, 2001 attacks four days earlier.

Two years after the reopening, the causeway was renamed the Queen Isabella Memorial Bridge to honor the victims of the accident.

References

External links

Governor's Press Release on Reopened Causeway
 Destination South Padre Island

Bridge disasters in the United States
Bridge disasters caused by collision
Transportation in Cameron County, Texas
Disasters in Texas
Buildings and structures in Cameron County, Texas
1996 in Texas
2001 in Texas
Transportation disasters in Texas
1974 establishments in Texas